Tarvisio (German and) is a comune in the northeastern part of the autonomous Friuli Venezia Giulia region in Italy.

Geography

The town is in the Canal Valley (Val Canale) between the Carnic Alps and Karawanks ranges in the north and the Julian Alps in the south. Located at the border with both Austria and Slovenia, Tarvisio and its neighbouring municipalities of Arnoldstein and Kranjska Gora form the tripoint of Romance, Germanic and Slavic Europe. The height west of the town centre marks the watershed between the Slizza creek, a tributary of the Gail River which is part of the Danube basin and the Fella River, a tributary of the Tagliamento discharging into the Adriatic Sea. Tarvisio together with the rest of the Canal Valley was part of Austria until 1919.

Tarvisio has access to the A23 Alpe-Adria autostrada, part of the European route E55, running from the Austrian A2 Süd Autobahn to Udine, and the A4 autostrada at Palmanova. The Tarvisio railway station is located at the new Pontebbana line from Villach to Udine opened in 2000, that replaced the tracks of the former Austro-Hungarian k.k. Staatsbahn built in 1879.

Climate

Languages
As a former component of the Austrian Empire, until 1918, the town, as was the rest of the Canal Valley, was overwhelmingly German- and Slovenian-speaking. Today the municipality speaks mostly Italian; German-speakers and Slovenes make up a small minority. In 1983 the town registered 84% Italian-speakers, 9% German-speakers and 7% Slovene-speakers. In 2012, the mayor put up multilingual signs in four languages, Italian, German, Slovene, and the regional minority language of Friulian, saying "the inhabitants deserve to use their mother tongues freely."

Parishes
The comune of Tarvisio includes the following frazioni (fractional parishes):
Names in: Italian (German, Slovene, Friulian):
 Camporosso (Saifnitz, Žabnice, Cjamparos)
 Cave del Predil (Raibl, Rabelj, Rabil/Predil)
 Coccau (Goggau, Kokova, Cocau)
 Fusine in Valromana (Weißenfels/Weissenfels, Fužine/Bela Peč, Fusinis)
 Monte Lussari (Luschariberg, Svete Višarje, Mont Sante di Lussari)
 Muda (Mauth, Muta, Mude)
 Plezzut (Flitschl, Flíčl, Pleçùt)
 Poscolle (Hinterschloss, Zágradec, Puscuèl)
 Rutte (Greuth, Trbiške rute, Rute)
 Sant'Antonio (Sankt Anton, Sveti Anton, Sant Antòni)
 Riofreddo (Kaltwasser, Mrzla Voda)

History
As a place upon ancient trade routes across the Alps to Venice, Tarvisio's roots date back to Roman times. In 1007 Emperor Henry II vested the newly created Diocese of Bamberg with the Carinthian Canal Valley down to Pontebba, a region which had considerable importance because of nearby ore mines and ironworks, especially around the village of Fusine in Valromana (Weißenfels/Bela Peč/Fusinis). Tarvisio remained a southern exclave of the Prince-Bishopric of Bamberg, until in 1758 the bishop finally sold Tarvisio to the Habsburg Empress Maria Theresa of Austria. Until 1918 it was part of the Duchy of Carinthia, it received town privileges in 1909.

Main sights

Tarvisio features include the parish church Saints Peter and Paul, built in the 15th century, as well as sceneries like the Fusine laghi mountain lakes. At the summit of the  Mount Lussari is a pilgrimage church, where according to legend in 1360 a shepherd discovered a statue of Virgin Mary. The church and the nearby ski centre can be reached by cable car from Malborghetto Valbruna. The area around the Sella Nevea mountain pass between Tarvisio and Chiusaforte is also a popular ski resort.

Economy
For decades, Tarvisio benefited economically from people coming from Austria and Yugoslavia for shopping trips. However, trade at the notorious "Rag Market" diminished after the implementation of Schengen Agreement and the establishment of the Eurozone. Today, tourism and winter sports in the Karawanks, the Carnic Alps, and the Julian Alps have become important industries. Tarvisio is known for its heavy alpine snow, which attracts many tourists for skiing and snowboarding, especially school groups. It was host to the 2003 Winter Universiade and the Women's 2007 Alpine Skiing World Cup.

Transport
 Tarvisio Boscoverde railway station

People
People who were born or lived in Tarvisio include:
Lambert Ehrlich (1878–1942), Slovene Roman Catholic priest, political figure, and ethnologist

Nives Meroi, Italian mountaineer who summit all fourteen eight thousand meter peaks in the world

References 

Cities and towns in Friuli-Venezia Giulia
Carnic Alps
Ski areas and resorts in Italy